Filippo Roccabella or Filippo Riccabella (died 1571) was a Roman Catholic prelate who served as Bishop of Recanati (1553–1571)
and Bishop of Macerata (1546–1553).

Biography
On 27 Jan 1546, Filippo Roccabella was appointed during the papacy of Pope Paul III as Bishop of Macerata.
On 22 Aug 1546, he was consecrated bishop by Giovanni Giacomo Barba, Bishop of Teramo, with Giovanni Andrea Mercurio, Archbishop of Manfredonia, and Jérome Buccaurati, Bishop of Acci, serving as co-consecrators. 
On 6 Mar 1553, he was appointed during the papacy of Pope Julius III as Bishop of Recanati.
He served as Bishop of Recanati until his death in 1571.

While bishop, he was the principal co-consecrator of Jean de Bertrand (cardinal), Bishop of Comminges (1560) .

References

External links and additional sources
 (for Chronology of Bishops) 
 (for Chronology of Bishops) 
 (for Chronology of Bishops) 
 (for Chronology of Bishops) 

16th-century Italian Roman Catholic bishops
Bishops appointed by Pope Paul III
Bishops appointed by Pope Julius III
1571 deaths